Carineta diardi is a species of insects in the order Hemiptera (true bugs).

Distribution
This species is present in South America.

References

External links
 Cicada mania

Insects described in 1829
Carinetini